A Member of Parliament in the Rajya Sabha (abbreviated: MP) is the representative of the Indian states to the one of the two houses of the Parliament of India (Rajya Sabha). Rajya Sabha MPs are elected by the electoral college of the elected members of the State Assembly with a system of proportional representation by a single transferable vote. Parliament of India is bicameral with two houses; Rajya Sabha (Upper house i.e. Council of States) and the Lok Sabha (Lower house i.e. House of the People). The total number of members of Rajya Sabha are lesser than the Members of Parliament in the Lok Sabha and have more restricted power than the lower house (Lok Sabha). Unlike membership to the Lok Sabha, membership to the Rajya Sabha is permanent body and cannot be dissolved at any time. However every second year, one third of the members are retired and vacancy are filled up by fresh elections and Presidential nomination at the beginning of every third year.

Responsibilities of the members of parliament
Broad responsibilities of the members of parliament of Rajya Sabha are:
 Legislative responsibility: To pass Laws of India in the Rajya Sabha.
 Oversight responsibility: To ensure that the executive (i.e. government) performs its duties satisfactorily.
 Representative responsibility: To represent the views and aspirations of the people of their constituency in the Parliament of India (Rajya Sabha).
 Power of the purse responsibility: To approve and oversee the revenues and expenditures proposed by the government.
 The Union Council of Ministers, who are also members of parliament have an additional responsibility of the executive as compared to those who are not in the Council of Ministers.

Special powers
Members of Parliament in the Rajya Sabha enjoy special powers and responsibilities with regard to:
 Making laws on any subject in the State List;
 Making laws to create services at national level.

Term
Unlike membership to the Lok Sabha, membership to the Rajya Sabha is permanent. One third of its members retire every two years. So each member has a term of six years

Qualifications for being a member of parliament
A person must satisfy all following conditions to be qualified to become a member of parliament of the Rajya Sabha:
 Must be a citizen of India
 30 years of age

Disqualifications for being a member of parliament
A person would be ineligible for being a Member of the Rajya Sabha if the person:
 Holds any office of profit under the Government of India (other than an office permitted by Parliament of India by law).
 Is of unsound mind.
 Is an undischarged insolvent.
 Has ceased to be a citizen of India.
 Is so disqualified by any law made by the Indian Parliament.
 Is so disqualified on the ground of defection.
 Has been convicted, among other things, for promoting enmity between different groups.
 Has been convicted for offence of bribery.
 Has been punished for preaching and practicing social crimes such as untouchability, dowry, sati.
 Has been convicted for an offence and sentenced to imprisonment.
 Has been dismissed for corruption or for disloyalty to the State (in case of a government servant).

Composition/strength

Membership in the Rajya Sabha is limited to 250 members, and up to 238 members are elected by the members of all the Vidhan Sabhas (individual state legislatures) and up to 12 are nominated by the President for their contributions to art, literature, science, and social services. The strength can be lower than 250: the current one is at 245. (See next section on members.)

Members of the Rajya Sabha

See also
 Member of parliament, Lok Sabha
 Parliament of India

References 

Rajya Sabha
Members of the Parliament of India